Artur Axmann (18 February 1913 – 24 October 1996) was the German Nazi national leader (Reichsjugendführer) of the Hitler Youth (Hitlerjugend) from 1940 to 1945, when the war ended. He was the last living Nazi with a rank equivalent to Reichsleiter.

Early life and career 
Axmann was born in Hagen, Westphalia, the son of an insurance clerk. In 1916, his family moved to Berlin-Wedding, where his father died two years later. The young Axmann was a good student and received a scholarship to attend secondary school. He joined the Hitler Youth in November 1928 after he had heard Nazi Gauleiter Joseph Goebbels speak. Axmann became leader of the local cell in the Wedding district. He also joined the National Socialist Schoolchildren's League in which he distinguished himself as an orator.

Nazi career 

In September 1931, Axmann joined the Nazi Party and the next year he was called to the NSDAP Reichsjugendführung to carry out a reorganisation of Hitler Youth factory and vocational school cells. After the Nazi seizure of power in 1933, he rose to a regional leader and became Chief of the Social Office of the Reich Youth Leadership. 

Axmann directed the Hitler Youth in state vocational training and succeeded in raising the status of Hitler Youth agricultural work. He was also a member of Hans Frank's Academy for German Law and the Chairman of its Committee on Youth Law. In November 1934, he was appointed Hitler Youth leader of Berlin and from 1936, presided at the annual Reichsberufswettkampf competitions. On 30 January 1939 he was awarded the Golden Party Badge. On 1 May 1940, he was appointed deputy to Nazi Reichsjugendführer Baldur von Schirach, whom he succeeded three months later on 8 August 1940. In October 1941, Axmann became a member of the Reichstag from electoral constituency 1, East Prussia.

After World War II began in Europe, Axmann was on active service on the Western Front until May 1940. As a member of the Wehrmacht 23rd Infantry Division, he was severely wounded on the Eastern Front in 1941 and lost his right arm.

In early 1943, Axmann proposed the formation of the 12th SS Panzer Division Hitlerjugend to Heinrich Himmler, with servicemen drawn from the Hitler Youth. Hitler approved the plan for the combat division to be made up of Hitler Youth members born in 1926, and recruitment and training began. In the last weeks of the war in Europe, Axmann commanded units of the Hitler Youth, which had been incorporated into the Home Guard (Volkssturm). His units consisted mostly of children and adolescents and fought in the Battle of Seelow Heights and the Battle in Berlin.

Berlin, 1945 
During Hitler's last days in Berlin, Axmann was among those present in the Führerbunker. Meanwhile, it was announced in the German press that Axmann had been awarded the German Order, the highest decoration that the Nazi Party could bestow on an individual for his services to the Reich. He and one other recipient, Konstantin Hierl, were the only holders of the award to survive the war and its consequences. All other recipients were either awarded it posthumously or were killed during the war or its aftermath.

On 30 April 1945, just a few hours before committing suicide, Hitler signed the order to allow a breakout. According to a report made to his Soviet captors by Obergruppenführer Hans Rattenhuber, the head of Hitler's bodyguard, Axmann took the Walther PP pistol that had been removed from Hitler's sitting room in the Führerbunker by Heinz Linge, Hitler's valet, which Hitler had used to commit suicide and said that he would "hide it for better times".

On 1 May, Axmann left the Führerbunker as part of a breakout group, which included Martin Bormann, Werner Naumann and SS doctor Ludwig Stumpfegger. The group managed to cross the River Spree at the Weidendammer Bridge.

Leaving the rest of their group, Bormann, Stumpfegger, and Axmann walked along railway tracks to Lehrter railway station. Bormann and Stumpfegger followed the railway tracks towards Stettiner station. Axmann decided to go in the opposite direction of his two companions. When he encountered a Red Army patrol, Axmann doubled back. He saw two bodies, which he later identified as Bormann and Stumpfegger, on the Invalidenstraße bridge near the railway switching yard (Lehrter Bahnhof), the moonlight clearly illuminating their faces. He did not have time to check the bodies thoroughly and so he did not know how they died. His statements were confirmed by the discovery of Bormann's and Stumpfegger's remains in 1972.

Post-war 

Axmann avoided capture by Soviet troops and lived under the alias of "Erich Siewert" for several months. In December 1945, Axmann was arrested in Lübeck when a Nazi underground movement, which he had been organising, was uncovered by a US Army counterintelligence operation.

In May 1949, a Nuremberg denazification court sentenced Axmann to a prison sentence of three years and three months as a "major offender". He was not found guilty of war crimes.

On 19 August 1958, a West Berlin court fined the former Hitler Youth leader 35,000 marks (approximately £3,000, or US$8,300), about half the value of his property in Berlin. The court found him guilty of indoctrinating German youth with National Socialism until the end of the war in Europe but concluded that he was not guilty of war crimes.

After his release from custody, Axmann worked as a businessman with varying success. From 1971 he left Germany for a number of years and lived on the Spanish island of Gran Canaria. Axmann returned to Berlin in 1976, where he died on 24 October 1996, aged 83. His cause of death and details of his surviving family members were not disclosed.

See also 
 Glossary of Nazi Germany
 List of Nazi Party leaders and officials
Downfall, 2004 German film where he was portrayed by actor Alexander Styopin

References

Citations

Bibliography

Further reading
 Axmann, Artur : "Das kann doch nicht das Ende sein." Hitlers letzter Reichsjugendführer erinnert sich. Koblenz: Bublies, 1995. 
 Selby, Scott Andrew (2012). The Axmann Conspiracy: The Nazi Plan for a Fourth Reich and How the U.S. Army Defeated It. Berkley (Penguin). .

External links
 

1913 births
1996 deaths
German amputees
German Army personnel of World War II
Hitler Youth members
Members of the Academy for German Law
Members of the Reichstag of Nazi Germany
Nazi Party politicians
Officials of Nazi Germany
People from Hagen
People from the Province of Westphalia
Recipients of the German Order (decoration)
Volkssturm personnel